Lon Goldstein Field is an approximately 2,000 seat baseball park located in Fort Worth, Texas.

The ballpark was opened in 1975, as part of the athletic field for the Fort Worth Independent School District.

The ballpark is bounded by Joe B. Rushing Road (north, left field), beyond which is Rolling Hills Park; C.A. Roberson Boulevard (west, third base), across which is Tarrant County College South Campus; athletic facilities and the football stadium, and then Interstate Highway 20 (south, first base); and soccer fields and Wichita Street (east, right field).

The ballpark also hosted the Fort Worth Cats in 2001 while the new club awaited the reconstruction of  LaGrave Field.

External links
Photos of Lon Goldstein Field
More photos

Minor league baseball venues
Sports venues in Fort Worth, Texas
Baseball venues in the Dallas–Fort Worth metroplex
Baseball venues in Texas
Fort Worth Independent School District
1974 establishments in Texas
Sports venues completed in 1974
High school baseball venues in the United States